Mohamed Yaghni (born February 22, 1988 in Tiaret) is an Algerian footballer. He currently plays for JSM Tiaret in the Algerian Ligue 2.

External links
 DZFoot Profile
 

1988 births
People from Tiaret
Algerian footballers
Algerian Ligue Professionnelle 1 players
Algerian Ligue 2 players
Living people
USM Blida players
USM El Harrach players
USM Bel Abbès players
USMM Hadjout players
Association football defenders
21st-century Algerian people